77185 Cherryh, provisional designation , is a background asteroid from the central regions of the asteroid belt, approximately  in diameter. It was discovered on 20 March 2001, by American amateur astronomers Don Wells and Alex Cruz at the George Observatory in Needville, Texas. The dark asteroid was named for American writer C. J. Cherryh.

Orbit and classification 

Cherryh is a non-family asteroid from the main belt's background population. It orbits the Sun in the central asteroid belt at a distance of 2.1–3.1 AU once every 4 years and 2 months (1,528 days; semi-major axis of 2.6 AU). Its orbit has an eccentricity of 0.17 and an inclination of 3° with respect to the ecliptic. The body's observation arc begins in October 1990, with a precovery taken by Spacewatch, more than 10 years prior to its official discovery observation at Needville.

Naming 

This minor planet was named by the discovering members of the Fort Bend Astronomy Club (FBAC), after C. J. Cherryh (born 1942), the award-winning American science fiction and fantasy author. The official  was published by the Minor Planet Center on 13 July 2004.

Physical characteristics 

According to the survey carried out by the NEOWISE mission of NASA's Wide-field Infrared Survey Explorer, Cherryh measures 3.985 kilometers in diameter and its surface has an albedo of 0.049. The asteroid's spectral type is unknown. Based on its low geometric albedo it is likely a carbonaceous C-type asteroid. As of 2018, no rotational lightcurve of Cherryh has been obtained from photometric observations. The body's rotation period, pole and shape remain unknown.

References

External links 
 FBAC Asteroid and HEAT Team Page, FBAC Asteroid Discoveries at the George Observatory 
 Don Wells, home page 
 Dictionary of Minor Planet Names, Google books
 Discovery Circumstances: Numbered Minor Planets (75001)-(80000) – Minor Planet Center
 
 

077185
Discoveries by Don J. Wells
Named minor planets
77185 Cherryh
20010320